Suzak is a district of Jalal-Abad Region in western Kyrgyzstan. The administrative seat lies at Suzak.

Population

Towns, rural communities and villages
In total, Suzak District includes 1 town and 123 settlements in 13 rural communities (ayyl aymagy). Each rural community can consist of one or several villages. The rural communities and settlements in the Suzak District are:

 town Kök-Janggak
 Bagysh (seat: Oktyabr'; incl. Bagysh, Besh-Bala, Kedey-Aryk, Kyzyl-Tuu, Sary-Bulak and Safarovka)
 Barpy (seat: Komsomol; incl. Achy, Boz-Chychkan, Besh-Moynok, Jangy-Ayyl, Jar-Kyshtak, Döböy, Kandy, Ming-Örük, Markay, Prigorodny, Say, Töölös, Tashtak, Türk-Maala, Ülgü, Changget-Say, Cheke-Döbö and Chokmor)
 Kara-Alma (seat: Kara-Alma; incl. Ortok, Tuura-Janggak and Urumbash)
 Kara-Daryya (seat: Aral; incl. Tösh and Changgyr-Tash)
 Kök-Art (seat: Mikhaylovka; incl. Komsomol, Podgornoye and Üch-Malay)
 Kurmanbek (seat: Taran-Bazar; incl. Joon-Kunggöy, Kalmak-Kyrchyn, Kanjyga, Kara-Cholok, Sary-Bulak, Saty and Urumbash) 
 Kyz-Köl (seat: Karamart; incl. Ak-Bulak, Ak-Took, Jangy-Aryk, Jylan-Temir, Kadu, Kara-Bulak, Katyrangky, Kashka-Terek, Kyz-Köl, Kyzyl-Kyya and Sary-Bulak)
 Kyzyl-Tuu (seat: Boston; incl. Ak-Bulak, Ak-Terek, Akchaluu, Almaluu-Bulak, Kara-Ingen, Kara-Köl, Kyzyl-Sengir, Orto-Aziya, Soku-Tash, Ak-Bash, Shatrak, Jangy-Achy, Kashka-Suu, Jashasyn-2, Alchaluu, Kyzyl-Alma, Talaa-Bulak, Tashtak and Munduz)
 Lenin (seat: Lenin; incl. Orto-Say and Jygach-Korgon)
 Saypidin Atabekov (seat: Bek-Abad; incl. Balta-Kazy, Bököy, Boston, Jangy-Jer, Jiyde, Kaynar, Kara-Jygach, Kashkar-Maala, Kyzyl-Bagysh, Kyrgyz-Abad, Munduz, Nayman, Tash-Bulak, Türk-Abad, Özbek-Abad, Chek and Shirin)
 Suzak (seat: Suzak; incl. Aral, Blagoveshchenka, Jangy-Dyykan, Dostuk, Kamysh-Bashy, Kyr-Jol and Sadda)
 Tash-Bulak (seat: Tash-Bulak; incl. Aral, Gülstan, Dimitrovka, Doskana, Eshme, Jangy-Aral, Irrigator, Teplitsa, Cholok-Terek and Yntymak)
 Yrys (seat: Kümüsh-Aziz; incl. Aral-Say, Jar-Kyshtak, Dömör, Kaynar, Kurgak-Köl, Kyr-Jol, Ladan-Kara, Masadan, Sasyk-Bulak, Totuya, Chymchyk-Jar and Yrys)

References 

Districts of Jalal-Abad Region